The Omei horned toad (Boulenophrys omeimontis), also known as the Mount Omei spadefoot toad, is a species of frog in the family Megophryidae. It is found in Sichuan and Tibet in China, including the type locality, Mount Emei and possibly in Vietnam. Its natural habitats are subtropical or tropical moist lowland forests, subtropical or tropical moist montane forests, and rivers. It is threatened by habitat loss.

References

Boulenophrys
Amphibians of China
Endemic fauna of China
Taxonomy articles created by Polbot
Amphibians described in 1950